Alessio Arfè (born 18 January 1987) is an Italian footballer who plays as a goalkeeper. He appeared in the fourth tier of football in Italy for Val di Sangro and Viareggio.

Biography
Arfè was signed by A.C. Siena in 2005. In 2006–07 season he wore no.87 shirt. On 1 February 2007 he joined Val di Sangro.
In mid-2008 he joined Viareggio, replacing departed Danilo Russo. He played 20 games (2 more in play-offs) and the rest was played by Luca Babbini. After the club promoted to Lega Pro Prima Divisione, he left the club and joined Serie D side Fortis Juventus. In March 2011 he was re-signed by Viareggio in a 4-month contract to provide extra cover for Carlo Pinsoglio and Giorgio Merlano (themselves were replacing Nicola Ravaglia and Babbini).

References

External links
 Viareggio Profile 
 
 Football.it Profile 
 Serie A Profile 
 LaSerieD.com Profile 

Italian footballers
A.S.D. Olimpia Colligiana players
A.C.N. Siena 1904 players
A.S. Sambenedettese players
F.C. Esperia Viareggio players
Association football goalkeepers
Footballers from Naples
1987 births
Living people